Bump in the Night is an American stop-motion animated series by Danger Productions and Greengrass Productions. The show was filmed using stop-motion animation and aired on ABC from 1994 to 1995. It was created and directed by Ken Pontac and David Bleiman.

Synopsis
Mr. Bumpy is a small green, purple-warted monster living under the bed of a ten-year-old boy, where he eats dirty socks and dust bunnies as if they were delicacies. His best friends are Squishington, a blue monster that lived in the bathroom's toilet cistern; and Molly Coddle, a Frankenstein's monster-like rag doll belonging to the boy's sister who acts as the straight man to the others' crazy antics.

Other characters include Destructo, the boy's toy robot who sees himself as a cop and persecutes Mr. Bumpy for his actions. There is also the Closet Monster, who's made up of the boy's pile of clothes and chases after Mr. Bumpy.

Structure 
The show was traditionally split into two major parts per half-hour (occasionally dedicating a full half hour per show, or sometimes splitting into three parts), and had a music video at the end of the episode, starring the three main characters and any minor characters involved in the episode. This musical montage would take clips from the episode itself and reiterate the life lessons learned in the episode.

Cast

Main
 Jim Cummings – Mr. Bumpy, the Closet Monster, Destructo
 Rob Paulsen – Squishington, Sleemoth, Dad
 Gail Matthius – Miss Molly Coddle, Anti-Molly
 Mary McDonald Lewis – The Mom, the Cute Dolls
 Jeff Bennett – Gloog
 Janice Kawaye – Little Robot/Big Robot, Little Robot's Sister/Big Robot's Sister, Yellow Bunny
 Scott McAfee – The Boy
 Anndi McAfee – Little Sister
 Brad Garrett – Big Mike
 Jennifer Darling and Valery Pappas – The Cute Dolls

Additional talent
 Danny Mann – Phil Silverfish
 Elizabeth Daily – Germ Girl
 Gilbert Gottfried – Odiferous J. Stench
 April Winchell – Auntie Matta, The Princess, The Cute Dolls
 Cheech Marin – Juaquin Gusanito Sin Manos
 Cathy Moriarty – Destructette

Performing musicians for the music of the show: Wayne Boone (guitar), Kevin Konklin (guitar), Eric Ferry (drums), and Ray Brinker (drums).

Episodes

Season 1 (1994)

Season 2 (1995)

Christmas special (1995)

Production
The development of the series began as a series of ad bumpers for ABC's Saturday morning lineup in 1993. In 1996, DIC Entertainment purchased the show's rights, despite never producing it.

Home releases
On VHS, the series was released by Capital Cities/ABC Video Enterprises and later Anchor Bay Entertainment on many VHS volumes:

In September 2003, Sterling Entertainment released a VHS/DVD called Night of the Living Bread, containing 6 segments. 3 additional segments were included on DVD. In April 2010, Shout! Factory released Bump In The Night: The Complete Series on DVD. In February 2016, Mill Creek Entertainment re-released Bump in the Night – The Complete Series on DVD in Region 1.

References

External links
Mr. Bumpy's Unofficial Home Page
 

American Broadcasting Company original programming
1990s American animated television series
1994 American television series debuts
1995 American television series endings
American children's animated adventure television series
American children's animated comedy television series
American children's animated fantasy television series
American children's animated horror television series
American children's animated musical television series
American stop-motion animated television series
Animated television series about children
Clay animation television series
Sentient toys in fiction
Television series by DIC Entertainment
Television series by DHX Media
English-language television shows
Television shows set in San Francisco
Animated television series about monsters
American television series with live action and animation